Andrew Jude Vasquez (born September 14, 1993) is an American professional baseball pitcher for the Philadelphia Phillies of Major League Baseball (MLB). He played college baseball for the University of California, Santa Barbara and Westmont College. He was drafted by the Minnesota Twins in the 32nd round of the 2015 Major League Baseball Draft. He made his MLB debut in 2018. He previously played for the Twins, Los Angeles Dodgers, Toronto Blue Jays and San Francisco Giants.

Career
Vasquez attended Los Osos High School in Rancho Cucamonga, California. He was drafted by the Kansas City Royals in the 44th round of the 2011 Major League Baseball Draft, but did not sign and played college baseball at the University of California, Santa Barbara and Westmont College.

Minnesota Twins
He was drafted by the Minnesota Twins in the 32nd round of the 2015 Major League Baseball Draft and signed.
He made his professional debut with the Rookie-level Gulf Coast Twins, going 0–0 with a 2.92 ERA in 12 innings. 

He split the 2016 season between the Class A Short Season Elizabethton Twins and the Class A Cedar Rapids Kernels. He accumulated a 3–0 record with a 1.41 ERA in 38 innings. 

He split his 2017 season between Cedar Rapids and the Class A-Advanced Fort Myers Miracle, accumulating a 4–1 record with a 1.55 ERA in 57.1 innings. He played for the Surprise Saguaros of the Arizona Fall League during the 2017 offseason. 

He split his 2018 minor league season between Fort Myers, the Double-A Chattanooga Lookouts, and the Triple-A Rochester Red Wings. He accumulated a 1–2 record with a 1.30 ERA and 108 strikeouts in 69.1 innings.

Vasquez was called up to the majors for the first time on September 1, 2018. In 5 major league innings, he went 1–0 with a 5.40 ERA.

Vasquez was outrighted off the 40-man roster on July 4, 2019.
He split the 2019 season between the Rookie-Ball Gulf Coast League Twins, Double-A Pensacola Blue Wahoos, and Triple-A Rochester Red Wings. In 30 appearances, Vasquez went 2–3 with a 5.40 ERA and 51 strikeouts in 36.2 innings.

Due to the Covid-19 pandemic, Vasquez did not make an appearance during the 2020 season.

Vasquez was assigned to the Triple-A St. Paul Saints to begin the 2021 season. He went 4–0 through 33 appearances, while posting a 3.61 ERA with 68 strikeouts in 42.1 innings.

Los Angeles Dodgers
On August 31, 2021, Vasquez was traded to the Los Angeles Dodgers in exchange for Stevie Berman. He was added to the major league roster on September 2. He only pitched  innings for Los Angeles, appearing in two games. He allowed one run on one hit while striking out three batters in those games. 

He also pitched six innings for the Triple-A Oklahoma City Dodgers, where he allowed two runs on six hits. On November 30, Vasquez was non-tendered by the Dodgers, making him a free agent.

Toronto Blue Jays
On March 15, 2022, Vasquez signed a one-year, $800,000 contract with the Toronto Blue Jays. He posted an 8.10 ERA in 6.2 innings of relief for the team before he was injured on June 8 with an ankle sprain. Upon his return, he was placed on the Jays' minor league team for rehab.

Philadelphia Phillies
The Philadelphia Phillies claimed Andrew Vasquez off of waivers on August 2, 2022. He was designated for assignment on August 15.

San Francisco Giants
Vasquez was claimed off waivers by the San Francisco Giants on August 17, 2022.

Philadelphia Phillies (second stint)
On November 9, 2022, Vasquez was claimed off waivers by the Philadelphia Phillies.

References

External links

1993 births
Living people
People from Rancho Cucamonga, California
Sportspeople from San Bernardino County, California
Baseball players from California
Major League Baseball pitchers
Minnesota Twins players
Los Angeles Dodgers players
Toronto Blue Jays players
San Francisco Giants players
UC Santa Barbara Gauchos baseball players
Westmont Warriors baseball players
Gulf Coast Twins players
Elizabethton Twins players
Cedar Rapids Kernels players
Fort Myers Miracle players
Surprise Saguaros players
Chattanooga Lookouts players
Pensacola Blue Wahoos players
Rochester Red Wings players
St. Paul Saints players
Buffalo Bisons (minor league) players